Ruta Sepetys (born November 19, 1967) is a Lithuanian-American writer of historical fiction. As an author, she is a New York Times and international bestseller and winner of the Carnegie Medal.

She is a Rockefeller Foundation Bellagio Fellow and the first American writer of young adult literature to speak at the European Parliament and NATO. Her work has been  published in over sixty countries and forty languages and is currently in development for film and television.

Biography
Born in Michigan, Sepetys is the daughter of a Lithuanian refugee. She earned a B.S. in International Finance from Hillsdale College. While overseas, she studied at the Centre d’études Européennes in Toulon, France, and at the ICN Graduate Business School in Nancy, France.

Following graduation, she moved to Los Angeles. In 1994, she launched Sepetys Entertainment Group, Inc., an entertainment management firm  

In 2002, Sepetys was featured in Rolling Stone magazine's "Women in Rock" special issue as a woman driven to make a difference. She  is on the Board of Advisors for the Mike Curb College of Entertainment and Music Business at Belmont University and is also a director of the Make a Noise Foundation, a national non-profit that raises money for music education.

Sepetys published her first novel in 2011 and currently resides in Nashville, Tennessee. She has been described as a "seeker of lost stories" who hopes to give voice to those who weren't able to tell their story.

Fiction

Between Shades of Gray
Her first novel, Between Shades of Gray, about a teenage girl deported from her native Lithuania to Siberian Gulag labor camps after the Soviet occupation in 1941, was critically acclaimed and translated into over 30 languages.

The book is considered a roman à clef, with fictional characters wrapped around actual events and experiences. Ruta states that the novel represents the "extreme suffering and tremendous hope" displayed by the people of the Baltics.

In March 2013, Ruta became the first American author of young adult literature to give a presentation at European Parliament. Her discussion with MEPs in Brussels centered on the novel, the history of totalitarianism in the Baltics, and the importance of historical fiction. The novel is developed as a film, Ashes in the Snow.

Sepetys is a writer of historical fiction. Although Between Shades of Gray was initially written for children and young adults, the book has been widely read by many worldwide and is considered a book for all ages.

Out of the Easy
Out of the Easy is Sepetys' second published novel. It was released on February 12, 2013 and features Josie Moraine, a young woman in the 1950s French Quarter of New Orleans who struggles to escape her family and become the author of her own destiny. The story explores themes of feminism in historical context and post-war America. The novel became a New York Times bestseller and was chosen as an Editor's Choice in The New York Times on February 15, 2013.

Salt to the Sea
Salt to the Sea was published on February 2, 2016, and chronicles the 1945 refugee evacuation from East Prussia and the MV Wilhelm Gustloff disaster.

The sinking of the MV Wilhelm Gustloff is the single largest maritime disaster in history yet, to many, the story remains unknown.  In their starred review, Publishers Weekly said, 
"Sepetys delivers another knockout historical novel...she excels in shining light on lost chapters of history and this visceral novel proves a memorable testament to strength and resilience in the face of war and cruelty."
The New York Times added this in their review of Salt to the Sea—"Ruta Sepetys acts as champion of the interstitial people so often ignored—whole populations lost in the cracks of history." In June, 2017, Salt to the Sea was awarded The Carnegie Medal for stimulating empathy and solidarity.

The Fountains of Silence
Sepetys' novel,  The Fountains of Silence  was released on October 1, 2019. It is set in Madrid during the dictatorship of Spain's Francisco Franco. The story explores the repercussions  of war and the complexities of the dictatorship in Spain.

One of the topics covered in the book is the lost children of Francoism, who were children abducted from Spanish Republican parents and given to families deemed "less degenerate". The number of abducted children is estimated to be up to 300,000. The stolen children were sometimes also victims of child trafficking and illegal adoption.

I Must Betray You
As communist regimes are crumbling across Europe in 1989, I Must Betray You, published in 2022, describes seventeen year old Cristian Florescu's world in the isolation of Ceaușescu's Romania. He must decide whether to be an informant or resist the regime.

Adaptations
Between Shades of Gray has been released in an unabridged audiobook by Penguin Audio, narrated by Emily Klein; and has been translated into 30 languages and sold in as many countries.

It has also been adapted for film by Ben York Jones, directed by Marius A. Markevicius and produced by Chris Coen, Marius A. Markevicius, Žilvinas Naujokas, and Ruta Sepetys. The film is titled Ashes in the Snow and stars Bel Powley, Martin Wallström, and Lisa Loven Kongsli. It release in Lithuania in October 2018, and release in the US in early 2019.

Out of the Easy  has been released in an unabridged audiobook by Listening Library and is narrated by Lauren Fortgang.

Salt to the Sea has been released in an unabridged audiobook by Listening Library and is narrated by Jorjeana Marie, Will Damron, Cassandra Morris, and Michael Crouch.

In 2017, Salt to the Sea was optioned by Universal Pictures for film to be produced by Lorenzo Di Bonaventura. The Screenplay was written by Scott Neustadter and Michael H. Weber whose credits include “500 Days of Summer,” “The Fault in Our Stars,” “Our Souls at Night,” and “The Disaster Artist”.

Recognition

Postage stamp
In June 2018, to celebrate the 100 year anniversary of Lithuania's original independence, the Postmaster General in Lithuania unveiled a commemorative set of postage stamps paying tribute to people whose work created and strengthened the awareness of Lithuania. Sepetys was one of those included in the series.

The Carnegie Medal
On June 19, 2017, Ruta Sepetys was awarded The Carnegie Medal literary award in a ceremony at the Royal Institute of British Architects in London.  "

Cross of the Knight
On June 6, 2013, Sepetys was awarded the Knight's Cross of the Order for Merits to Lithuania.  Sepetys was decorated for her contributions to education and culture in conjunction with her global efforts to share the history of totalitarianism in the Baltics.

The Rockefeller Foundation
In 2015, Sepetys was awarded the Rockefeller Foundation's  Bellagio Center residency in Lake Como, Italy. As a Rockefeller Bellagio fellow, Sepetys was invited to spend a month at the Foundation's Bellagio Center interacting with other international resident thought leaders, policy makers, artists, and practitioners

Works

Books
 Between Shades of Gray (2011) 
 Out of the Easy (2013) 
 Salt to the Sea (2016) 
 The Fountains of Silence (2019) 
 I Must Betray You (2022)

Media articles and essays

References

External links

 

21st-century American novelists
American women novelists
American people of Lithuanian descent
Writers from Detroit
Hillsdale College alumni
Living people
1967 births
21st-century American women writers
Novelists from Michigan
Carnegie Medal in Literature winners